Tommy Newberry (Americas Success Coach) is the author of seven books—including the New York Times bestseller, The 4:8 Principle, and the motivational classic, Success is Not an Accident—both of which have been translated into dozens of languages. 

He is the president of The 1% Club, which was developed to assist entrepreneurs and their families in business leadership.  

The 4:8 Principle is a Wall Street Journal and New York Times bestseller. 

In addition to The 4:8 Principle, Newberry has authored Success is Not an Accident, 366 Days of Wisdom, Inspiration, and The War on Success.
Tommy Newberry frequently speaks at schools, churches, business conferences, and has appeared as a guest on over 200 radio and television programs, including Good News, Living the Life, Fox & Friends, The Lou Dobbs Show, Your World With Neil Cavuto, Janet Parshall’s America, The Fox News Strategy Room, Everyday with Lisa & Marcus and many others.

Tommy is also known by "Coach Tommy Newberry" and Americas Success Coach. 

He is also the founder of The Couples Planning Retreat, a luxury marriage retreat which helps couples take their marriages from good to great. 

Newberry is also an active motivational speaker.

References

External links

Official Website

American motivational speakers
Living people
Year of birth missing (living people)